Thippapur is a village in Nizamabad district, in Telangana State.

Transport
The village is situated near Bijapur Road with connections to nearby towns and cities with regular buses and other modes of transportation.

References

Villages in Nizamabad district
Nizamabad district